"Untitled 02 | 06.23.2014." (stylised as "untitled 02 | 06.23.2014.") is a song by American rapper Kendrick Lamar, featured on his compilation album, Untitled Unmastered. The song was produced by Cardo and Yung Exclusive.

Commercial performance
On the chart dated March 26, 2016, "Untitled 02 | 06.23.2014." entered the Billboard Hot 100 at number 79, powered by first-week digital download sales of 17,602 copies. The song was the highest charting track from the album.

Live performances
Lamar has performed "Untitled 02 | 06.23.2014." at every show on the Damn tour.

Weekly charts

References

2016 songs
Kendrick Lamar songs
Songs written by Kendrick Lamar
Song recordings produced by Cardo (record producer)